Alfred Louis Nesser (June 6, 1893 – March 11, 1967) was a professional American football guard and end. He played for seven teams: Akron Pros, Cleveland Bulldogs, Columbus Panhandles, Akron Indians, New York Giants, and Cleveland Indians in the National Football League (NFL) and the Cleveland Panthers in the first American Football League. He won NFL Championship titles with the Akron Pros in 1920 and the New York Giants in 1927. During his career, Nesser played against Charlie Copley, Fritz Pollard and Jim Thorpe.

Although he didn't play college football, prior to the formation of the NFL, Nesser played in the "Ohio League" for the Columbus Panhandles and the Canton Professionals (later renamed the Canton Bulldogs). He was one of the seven Nesser Brothers who played professional football. He became the last Nesser brother to retire from the game, when he ended his playing career in 1931. He was the last football player to play without having to use a mandatory helmet.

He died on March 11, 1967, in Akron, Ohio.

Although none of the Nessers have been named to the Pro Football Hall of Fame, Al was elected to the professional branch of the Helms Foundation Hall of Fame in 1952.  In 2004, he was named to the Professional Football Researchers Association Hall of Very Good in the association's second HOVG class

References

A Colorful Game: Names are in the Book

1893 births
Players of American football from Columbus, Ohio
Sportspeople from Columbus, Ohio
American football offensive linemen
Akron Indians coaches
Akron Indians players
Akron Pros players
Canton Professionals players
Cleveland Bulldogs players
Cleveland Indians (NFL 1931) players
Cleveland Panthers players
Columbus Panhandles players
Columbus Panhandles (Ohio League) players
New York Giants players
1967 deaths
Nesser family (American football)